Amber Jade Hall (born December 29, 1977) is a professional women's basketball player formerly in the WNBA. Her primary position was forward.

High school years
Born in Windsor, Ontario, Canada, Hall was raised in Vancouver, British Columbia, where she attended Britannia Secondary School. Hall is the only person to have ever played in the WNBA coming from Vancouver.

College years
Hall became Washington's career-leading rebounder in the final regular season game of the year at Washington State in 1998–99.

WNBA career
Hall played 20 games for the Portland Fire, the only team Hall played for in a regular-season game.

External links
WNBA Player Profile
Amber Hall Statistics on Basketball-Reference.com

References

1977 births
Living people
Black Canadian basketball players
Black Canadian sportswomen
Canadian expatriate basketball people in the United States
Canadian women's basketball players
Forwards (basketball)
Portland Fire players
Basketball players from Windsor, Ontario
Washington Huskies women's basketball players